Stay Positive may refer to:

Stay Positive (album), an album by The Hold Steady
"Stay Positive" (The Streets song)
Stay+, a British band